The Glorious Twelfth is the twelfth day of August, the start of the shooting season for red grouse (Lagopus lagopus scotica), and to a lesser extent the ptarmigan (Lagopus muta) in Great Britain and Northern Ireland. This is one of the busiest days in the shooting season, with large numbers of game being shot.  The date itself is traditional; the current legislation enshrining it in England and Wales is the Game Act 1831 (and in Northern Ireland, the Wildlife (Northern Ireland) Order 1985). Not all game (as defined by the 1831 act) have the same start to their open seasons – most begin on 1 September, with 1 October for woodcock and pheasant.
Since English law prohibits game bird shooting on a Sunday, the start date is postponed to 13 August on years when the 12th falls on a Sunday. 

Because grouse are in effect farmed for shooting, their population density is unnaturally high and they are particularly liable to outbreaks of disease such as sheep tick, heather beetle and the gut parasite Trichostrongylus tenuis, their numbers fluctuate considerably from year to year. In recent years, the Glorious Twelfth has also been hit by hunt saboteurs, the 2001 foot and mouth crisis (which further postponed the date in affected areas) and severe flooding and bad weather. In some seasons where certain moors are hit by low numbers of grouse, shooting may not occur at all or may be over by September.

See also
Hunting in the United Kingdom

References

Hunting and shooting in the United Kingdom
Grouse
Annual events in the United Kingdom